The Nielsen & Winther Type AA, also known as the Type AA, was a Danish fighter aircraft of the 1910s manufactured by Nielsen & Winther in Copenhagen.

Development
The first Danish fighter aircraft to be conceived and built, the single seat Type AA was of wooden construction and powered by a 90 hp Thulin rotary engine. It was armed with two guns.

Operational history
The first flight took place on 21 January 1917. The plane was tested again in 1918, this time with synchronising gear for its single Madsen machine gun.  During 1917 six Type AA aircraft were delivered to the Danish Army, though they saw little service and were retired in 1919 owing to engine unreliability.

Variants
 Type AB
 Two-seat reconnaissance version, prototype
 Type AC
 Floatplane version of the Type AA, prototype

Operators

Danish Army (Royal Danish Army Air Corps)

Royal Norwegian Air Force

Aircraft on display
Danmarks Flyvemuseum, Helsingør: Replica Type AA

Specifications (Type AA)

References

1910s Danish fighter aircraft
Sesquiplanes
Aircraft first flown in 1917
Single-engined tractor aircraft